During the 1990s attempts were made to introduce the sport of rugby league to Kenya. In 2013 rugby league was introduced to Kenya once more by Glenn and Caroline Jamieson with a real emphasize in youth rugby league.

History
The catalyst for the attempt to introduce rugby league into Kenya came from Eddie Rombo, a former Kenyan rugby union player, who went on to play rugby league with British side Leeds Rhinos. After retiring from the sport, Rombo announced his intention to return to his native land and establish rugby league. In 2000, he did so, with the backing of a Kenyan businessman named Eric Murungi. Teams were formed, coaching sessions undertaken and a website set up. However the efforts came to nought, and no rugby league game was ever played. In 2013, after seeing many of Kenya's youth missing the opportunity to participate in sport, Kenyan Caroline Jamieson along with husband Glenn Jamieson set up programs aimed at developing youth rugby league in Kenya, concentrating on the least fortunate.

See also

 Kenya national rugby league team

References

External links